Harry Clayton Wynne (July 10, 1920 - November 28, 1989) was an American professional football player who spend two seasons in the National Football League with the Boston Yanks in 1944 and the New York Giants in 1945. Wynne appeared in 15 career games, while making one start.

In addition to his football career, Wynne was an All-American basketball player at the University of Arkansas in 1943.

References

1920 births
1989 deaths
All-American college men's basketball players
Arkansas Razorbacks football players
Arkansas Razorbacks men's basketball players
Basketball players from Mississippi
Boston Yanks players
New York Giants players
People from Senatobia, Mississippi
Players of American football from Mississippi